Grand Forks-Greenwood was the name of a provincial electoral district in the Canadian province of British Columbia centred on the town of Grand Forks, in the Boundary Country between the Okanagan and Kootenay Countries.  The riding first appeared in the 1924 election as the result of a merger of the former ridings of Greenwood and Grand Forks, and lasted until the 1963 election.  As of 1966 the area was represented by Boundary-Similkameen.  The same area is now part of West Kootenay-Boundary.

For other ridings in the Kootenay region, please see Kootenay (electoral districts).

Demographics

Political geography

Notable elections

Notable MLAs

Electoral history 
Note:  Winners in each election are in bold.	

 
|Liberal
|Ezra Churchill Henniger
|align="right"|642 	
|align="right"|37.26%
|align="right"|
|align="right"|unknown

|- bgcolor="white"
!align="right" colspan=3|Total valid votes
!align="right"|1,723
!align="right"|100.00%
!align="right"|
|- bgcolor="white"
!align="right" colspan=3|Total rejected ballots
!align="right"|
!align="right"|
!align="right"|
|- bgcolor="white"
!align="right" colspan=3|Turnout
!align="right"|%
!align="right"|
!align="right"|
|}
  	  	  	 

 
|Liberal
|Dougald McPherson
|align="right"|790 	
|align="right"|47.08%
|align="right"|
|align="right"|unknown
|- bgcolor="white"
!align="right" colspan=3|Total valid votes
!align="right"|1,678 	
!align="right"|100.00%
!align="right"|
|- bgcolor="white"
!align="right" colspan=3|Total rejected ballots
!align="right"|33
!align="right"|
!align="right"|
|- bgcolor="white"
!align="right" colspan=3|Turnout
!align="right"|%
!align="right"|
!align="right"|
|}

 
|Co-operative Commonwealth Fed.t
|Robert Lawson
|align="right"|221 	
|align="right"|12.51%
|align="right"|
|align="right"|unknown

 
|Liberal
|Dougald McPherson
|align="right"|1,034 	
|align="right"|58.55%
|align="right"|
|align="right"|unknown
|- bgcolor="white"
!align="right" colspan=3|Total valid votes
!align="right"|1,766 
!align="right"|100.00%
!align="right"|
|- bgcolor="white"
!align="right" colspan=3|Total rejected ballots
!align="right"|1
!align="right"|
!align="right"|
|- bgcolor="white"
!align="right" colspan=3|Turnout
!align="right"|%
!align="right"|
!align="right"|
|- bgcolor="white"
!align="right" colspan=7|1  Details of returns were not supplied by the Returning Officer, only the total valid votes for each candidate, so the number of rejected ballots is unknown.
|}

 
|Co-operative Commonwealth Fed.
|Wilbert Richard Braithwaite
|align="right"|164 	
|align="right"|9.52%
|align="right"|
|align="right"|unknown
 
|Liberal
|Ezra Churchill Henniger
|align="right"|722
|align="right"|41.93%
|align="right"|
|align="right"|unknown

|- bgcolor="white"
!align="right" colspan=3|Total valid votes
!align="right"|1,722 	
!align="right"|100.00%
!align="right"|
|- bgcolor="white"
!align="right" colspan=3|Total rejected ballots
!align="right"|29

 
|Co-operative Commonwealth Fed.
|Alan Conway Clapp
|align="right"|365 		
|align="right"|22.20%
|align="right"|
|align="right"|unknown
 
|Liberal
|Ezra Churchill Henniger 
|align="right"|637 		
|align="right"|38.75%
|align="right"|
|align="right"|unknown

|- bgcolor="white"
!align="right" colspan=3|Total valid votes
!align="right"|1,644 	
!align="right"|100.00%
!align="right"|
|- bgcolor="white"
!align="right" colspan=3|Total rejected ballots
!align="right"|4
!align="right"|
!align="right"|
|- bgcolor="white"
!align="right" colspan=3|Turnout
!align="right"|%
!align="right"|
!align="right"|
|}

 
|Co-operative Commonwealth Fed.
|Rupert Haggen
|align="right"|922
|align="right"|44.14%
|align="right"|
|align="right"|unknown

|Independent
|Edwin Stanley Orris
|align="right"|294 	
|align="right"|14.07%
|align="right"|
|align="right"|unknown
|- bgcolor="white"
!align="right" colspan=3|Total valid votes
!align="right"|2,089
!align="right"|100.00%
!align="right"|
|- bgcolor="white"
!align="right" colspan=3|Total rejected ballots
!align="right"|23
!align="right"|
!align="right"|
|- bgcolor="white"
!align="right" colspan=3|Turnout
!align="right"|%
!align="right"|
!align="right"|
|}
 

 
|Co-operative Commonwealth Fed.
|Rupert Haggen
|align="right"|826
|align="right"|39.79%
|align="right"|1,043	
|align="right"|53.08%
|align="right"|
|align="right"|unknown
 
|Conservative
|Cecil Gordon McMynn
|align="right"|706             	
|align="right"|34.01%
|align="right"|922
|align="right"|46.92%
|align="right"|
|align="right"|unknown
 
|Liberal
|Edwin Stanley Orris
|align="right"|252    	
|align="right"|12.14%
|align="right"| - 
|align="right"| - %
|align="right"|
|align="right"|unknown
 
|B.C. Social Credit League
|Henry Edgar Parkyn
|align="right"|292     	
|align="right"|14.07%
|align="right"| - 
|align="right"| - %
|align="right"|
|align="right"|unknown
|- bgcolor="white"
!align="right" colspan=3|Total valid votes
!align="right"|2,076   
!align="right"|100.00%
!align="right"|1,965  	
!align="right"| - %
!align="right"|
|- bgcolor="white"
!align="right" colspan=3|Total rejected ballots
!align="right"|58
!align="right"|
!align="right"|
!align="right"|
!align="right"|
|- bgcolor="white"
!align="right" colspan=3|Turnout
!align="right"|%
!align="right"|
!align="right"|
|- bgcolor="white"
!align="right" colspan=7|2  Preferential ballot.  First and final counts of three (3) shown only.
|}
 

 
|Conservative
|Ruth Ellen May Euerby
|align="right"|177 	             	
|align="right"|8.51%
|align="right"| - 
|align="right"| -.- %
|align="right"|
|align="right"|unknown
 
|Co-operative Commonwealth Fed.
|Rupert Haggen
|align="right"|995
|align="right"|47.86%
|align="right"|1,016
|align="right"|50.12%
|align="right"|
|align="right"|unknown

 
|Liberal
|Klaus Scheer
|align="right"|324 	 		
|align="right"|15.58%
|align="right"|393 
|align="right"|19.39%
|align="right"|
|align="right"|unknown
|- bgcolor="white"
!align="right" colspan=3|Total valid votes
!align="right"|2,079 	  		 
!align="right"|100.00%
!align="right"|2,027  	
!align="right"| - %
!align="right"|
|- bgcolor="white"
!align="right" colspan=3|Total rejected ballots
!align="right"|145
!align="right"|
!align="right"|
!align="right"|
!align="right"|
|- bgcolor="white"
!align="right" colspan=3|Turnout
!align="right"|%
!align="right"|
!align="right"|
|- bgcolor="white"
!align="right" colspan=7|3  Preferential ballot.  First and final counts of two (2) shown only.
|}

 
|Co-operative Commonwealth Fed.
|Lois Haggen
|align="right"|877
|align="right"|42.57%
|align="right"|
|align="right"|unknown
 
|Liberal
|John Morris Jones
|align="right"|317 	 	
|align="right"|15.39%
|align="right"|
|align="right"|unknown
|- bgcolor="white"
!align="right" colspan=3|Total valid votes
!align="right"|2,060
!align="right"|100.00%
!align="right"|
|- bgcolor="white"
!align="right" colspan=3|Total rejected ballots
!align="right"|34
!align="right"|
!align="right"|
|- bgcolor="white"
!align="right" colspan=3|Turnout
!align="right"|%
!align="right"|
!align="right"|
|}

 
|Co-operative Commonwealth Fed.
|Lois Haggen
|align="right"|1,115
|align="right"|42.35%
|align="right"|
|align="right"|unknown
 
|Liberal
|Frank Martin
|align="right"|564 	
|align="right"|21.42%
|align="right"|
|align="right"|unknown
 
|Progressive Conservative
|Yasushi Sugimoto
|align="right"|202 	
|align="right"|7.67%
|align="right"|
|align="right"|unknown
|- bgcolor="white"
!align="right" colspan=3|Total valid votes
!align="right"|2,633
!align="right"|100.00%
!align="right"|
|- bgcolor="white"
!align="right" colspan=3|Total rejected ballots
!align="right"|40
!align="right"|
!align="right"|
|- bgcolor="white"
!align="right" colspan=3|Turnout
!align="right"|%
!align="right"|
!align="right"|
|}
  	  	  	  	 

 
|Liberal
|Milo Joseph McGarry
|align="right"|766 	
|align="right"|32.05%
|align="right"|
|align="right"|unknown
|- bgcolor="white"
!align="right" colspan=3|Total valid votes
!align="right"|2,390 	
!align="right"|100.00%
!align="right"|
|- bgcolor="white"
!align="right" colspan=3|Total rejected ballots
!align="right"|20
!align="right"|
!align="right"|
|- bgcolor="white"
!align="right" colspan=3|Turnout
!align="right"|%
!align="right"|
!align="right"|
|}	  	

The Boundary area was redistributed following the 1963 election.  The new riding representing the area as of the 1966 election was Boundary-Similkameen.

Sources 

Elections BC Historical Returns

Former provincial electoral districts of British Columbia